The following is a list of the 23 municipalities (comuni) of the former Province of Carbonia-Iglesias, Sardinia, Italy.

List

See also
List of municipalities of Italy

References

Carbonia-Iglesias